Qomam (also Romanized as Qomām) is a village in Gavrud Rural District, in the Central District of Sonqor County, Kermanshah Province, Iran. At the 2006 census, its population was 245, in 64 families.

References 

Populated places in Sonqor County